Williams Peak is a prominent peak over 1,400 m in a nodal position between the drainage of the Hobbs, Salmon and Garwood Glaciers, in Victoria Land. Named by the Victoria University of Wellington Antarctic Expedition (1960–61) for Dr. J. Williams, Vice-Chancellor of the University.

Mountains of Victoria Land
Scott Coast